"Deeper" is a song by English speed garage producer Serious Danger, released as a single in 1997. It reached the UK top 40, peaking at No. 40 on the UK Singles Chart, and also reached No. 1 on the UK Dance Singles Chart in December 1997. The song uses the hook and bassline of the 1991 song "Liquid Is Liquid" by Liquid.

Track listing
UK 12"
A1. "Deeper" (Part One)
A2. "Deeper" (Wildcat Remix)
B1. "Deeper" (Part Two)
B2. "Love Is Forever" (ISB Re-Edit)

Charts

References

1997 songs
1997 singles
UK garage songs